Kristine Marie Lilly Heavey (born July 22, 1971) is an American retired soccer player. She was a member of the United States women's national team for 23 years and is the most-capped football player in the history of the sport (men's or women's), gaining her 354th and final cap against Mexico in a World Cup qualifier in November 2010. Lilly scored 130 goals for the US national team, behind Mia Hamm's 158 goals, and Abby Wambach's 184.

Early life
Lilly was born in New York City and attended Wilton High School in Wilton, Connecticut. While still attending high school, Lilly became a member of the United States women's national team. She was recruited by the University of North Carolina at Chapel Hill.

University of North Carolina
Lilly competed as a student-athlete, playing for the university's North Carolina Tar Heels women's soccer team from 1989 to 1992. During her time there, she won the NCAA Women's Soccer Championship every year she played. She won the Hermann Trophy as a junior in 1991. As a senior, she won the Honda Sports Award as the nations's top soccer player. To honor her time with the school, North Carolina retired her #15 jersey in 1994.

Club career

Lilly began her career with Tyresö FF of Sweden in 1994. She spent one season with the club before returning to the United States. On August 20, 1995, Lilly joined Washington Warthogs of the now-defunct Continental Indoor Soccer League. She was the only woman in the all-male professional indoor league, following in the footsteps of Collette Cunningham and Shannon Presley who had played in the league sparingly in 1994.

Lilly joined W-League side Delaware Genies in 1998.  With the club, she appeared in four games, scoring five goals and providing two assists.

February 2001 saw the formation of the world's first women's professional soccer league in which all the players were paid. Women's United Soccer Association (WUSA) had its inaugural season in 2001. Lilly was the team captain and a founding member of Boston Breakers. In her first season with the team, she appeared in all twenty-one matches and played every minute of the season. She led the league in assists with eleven and added an additional three goals. For her performance, she was named First Team All-WUSA. In 2002, she started in a further nineteen games. She increased her point total for the season, scoring eight goals and assisting on thirteen others. She was again named First Team All-WUSA and was a starter on the WUSA North All-Star Team. In 2003 Lilly started all nineteen games in which she played, chipping in three goals and four assists and again being named to First Team All-WUSA, the only player in the history of the league to do so. Following the 2003 season, the WUSA ceased operations.

Following the termination of the league, Lilly followed former Boston Breakers head coach Pia Sundhage to Sweden to play for Damallsvenskan club KIF Örebro DFF in 2005. There she was joined by fellow USWNT teammate Christie Welsh as well as USWNT and Boston Breakers teammate, Kate Markgraf.

In late-2006 and early-2007, the formation of a new women's league took shape under the name of Women's Professional Soccer (WPS). On September 16, 2008, Lilly was allocated to Boston Breakers along with USWNT teammates Angela Hucles and Heather Mitts. The inaugural 2009 Women's Professional Soccer season saw Lilly appear in all twenty games (playing every minute) and score three goals with three assists.

International career

Lilly made her debut for the United States national team in 1987, when she was still attending high school. During her international career, she surpassed the previous women's world record of 151 caps, held by Norway's Heidi Støre, on May 21, 1998.  On January 30, 1999, she surpassed what was then the men's record of 164 caps, held by Adnan Al-Talyani of the United Arab Emirates.

Lilly has participated in the 1991, 1995, 1999, 2003, and 2007 editions of the FIFA Women's World Cup. She is a two-time World Cup champion, winning in 1991 and 1999; during extra time of the '99 Final against China, Lilly, standing on the goal line, blocked a Chinese shot which had passed goalkeeper Briana Scurry - since the tournament took place with the golden goal rule in effect, the game would have been over if China had scored - and in the ensuing shootout, she scored the goal which would give the US the lead. When she played against North Korea on September 11, 2007, in the 2007 FIFA Women's World Cup, she became the first woman (and only the third player overall) to participate in five different World Cup Finals; by scoring a goal against England on September 22, 2007, she became the oldest woman to score in the World Cup.

Lilly has also competed in the 1996, 2000, and 2004 editions of the Olympic Games. She won a gold medal in 1996 and 2004, and a silver medal in 2000. She missed the 2008 Summer Olympics due to the birth of her child.

Unlike several of her longtime teammates (among them Joy Fawcett, Julie Foudy, and Mia Hamm), she did not retire after the team's "farewell tour" which finished on December 8, 2004.

On January 18, 2006, Lilly made her 300th international appearance in a game against Norway. In the same match, she equaled Michelle Akers for second place on the team's all-time goal scoring list with 105. Lilly was named as a finalist for the 2006 FIFA Women's World Player of the Year. She finished second in the voting to Brazil's Marta.

After the birth of her daughter, Lilly returned to the national team in December 2008.  Her last match for the national team, representing her record 354th cap, was a World Cup qualifying loss to Mexico (1–2) on November 5, 2010, in which she played for six minutes as a substitute.

International goals

Coaching career
Lilly has been an assistant coach for the Boston Breakers since 2012.

Personal life
Lilly grew up in Wilton, Connecticut, and lives in Medfield, Massachusetts. She is married to Brookline firefighter David Heavey, a former hockey player and golfer at the University of Connecticut. Lilly gave birth to her first daughter Sidney Marie Heavey on her birthday, July 22, 2008, and her second daughter Jordan Mary Heavey on September 2, 2011.

She appeared in the HBO documentary Dare to Dream: The Story of the U.S. Women's Soccer Team.  Lilly helps run a soccer camp with Mia Hamm and Tisha Venturini-Hoch.

Career statistics

Club

Matches and goals scored at World Cup and Olympic tournaments
Kristine Lilly competed in five FIFA Women's World Cup: China 1991,
Sweden 1995,
USA 1999,
USA 2003 and China 2007;
and three Olympics:
Atlanta 1996,
Sydney 2000,
and Athens 2004;
altogether played in 46 matches and scored 12 goals at those eight global tournaments. With her USA teams, in eight world cup and olympic tournaments, Lilly  had 39 wins, 3 losses, and 4 draws; finished first place with her teams 4 times, second place once and third place 3 times.

Honors and awards

See also

 List of women's association football players with 100 or more international goals
 List of women's footballers with 100 or more caps
 List of University of North Carolina at Chapel Hill Olympians
 List of Olympic medalists in football
 List of 2004 Summer Olympics medal winners
 All-time Boston Breakers (WPS) roster

References

Match reports

Further reading
 Grainey, Timothy (2012), Beyond Bend It Like Beckham: The Global Phenomenon of Women's Soccer, University of Nebraska Press, 
 Lisi, Clemente A. (2010), The U.S. Women's Soccer Team: An American Success Story, Scarecrow Press, 
 Longman, Jere (2009), The Girls of Summer: The U.S. Women's Soccer Team and How it Changed the World, HarperCollins,

External links
 
 
 
 
 
 
 
 

1971 births
Living people
United States women's international soccer players
Footballers at the 1996 Summer Olympics
Footballers at the 2000 Summer Olympics
Footballers at the 2004 Summer Olympics
1995 FIFA Women's World Cup players
People from Wilton, Connecticut
Sportspeople from Brookline, Massachusetts
Olympic gold medalists for the United States in soccer
Olympic silver medalists for the United States in soccer
North Carolina Tar Heels women's soccer players
Continental Indoor Soccer League players
Washington Warthogs players
Women's United Soccer Association players
Boston Breakers (WUSA) players
Boston Breakers players
FIFA Century Club
American women's soccer players
1999 FIFA Women's World Cup players
2003 FIFA Women's World Cup players
2007 FIFA Women's World Cup players
1991 FIFA Women's World Cup players
Tyresö FF players
FIFA Women's World Cup-winning players
KIF Örebro DFF players
Damallsvenskan players
Expatriate women's footballers in Sweden
American expatriate sportspeople in Sweden
Women's association football midfielders
Women's association football forwards
Medalists at the 2004 Summer Olympics
Medalists at the 2000 Summer Olympics
Medalists at the 1996 Summer Olympics
National Soccer Hall of Fame members
Hermann Trophy women's winners
Wilton High School alumni
Women's Professional Soccer players